Gong Seung-yeon (born Yoo Seung-yeon on February 27, 1993), is a South Korean actress. She is best known for her roles in the film Aloners (2021) and television series such as Six Flying Dragons (2015–2016), The Master of Revenge (2016), Introverted Boss (2017), Circle (2017), Are You Human? (2018), Flower Crew: Joseon Marriage Agency (2018), Bulgasal: Immortal Souls (2021–2022), and The First Responders (2022–2023).

Early life 
Gong was born as Yoo Seung-yeon in Seoul, South Korea on February 27, 1993. She is the older sister of Twice's Yoo Jeong-yeon. Their father, Yoo Chang-joon, was a private chef for former president Kim Dae-jung, as well as a head chef of the Seoul Plaza Hotel for over 20 years, specializing in Korean cuisine. She graduated from Sungshin Women's University.

Career

2012–2014: Career beginnings
Gong first trained as a singer under SM Entertainment for seven years after winning the "Best Looks" portion of the SM Youth Best Contest in 2005. She left in 2012, after losing interest in singing.

Shortly after making her entertainment debut in a commercial for feminine hygiene product White (Yuhan-Kimberly) in 2012, Gong began appearing in small roles in television dramas.

2015–present: Rising popularity
In 2015, the relative newcomer drew mainstream notice when she joined the fourth season of the Korean reality show We Got Married, where she was paired with singer-actor Lee Jong-hyun.

Gong started to gain attention as an actress with her role in the historical drama Six Flying Dragons (2015–2016). She won the New Star Award at the SBS Drama Awards. Gong was also casts in the revenge series The Master of Revenge. She was then cast in her first leading role in youth sageuk My Only Love Song, which co-stars her We Got Married partner Lee Jong-hyun. The drama premiered on Netflix in 2017. In 2017, Gong starred in tvN's romantic comedy Introverted Boss. The same year, she took on a lead role in science fiction mystery series Circle.

It was announced that Gong signed with BH Entertainment in March 2018, after leaving her previous company Yuko Company. In 2018, she starred in KBS' science fiction romance drama Are You Human? with Seo Kang-joon. She also starred in the short film My Dream Class, and sang the theme song for the movie. In 2019, Gong was cast in the historical romance drama Flower Crew: Joseon Marriage Agency.

On July 13, 2020, Gong signed with a new agency, Varo Entertainment. It was also announced that Gong has been cast in the upcoming film Handsome Guys alongside Lee Hee-joon. In March 2021, Gong was confirmed to be starring in tvN's fantasy drama Bulgasal: Immortal Souls which aired in December 2021. Gong was recognised for her work in the film Aloners where she has won multiple awards, including the "Best New Actress" award at the 42nd Blue Dragon Film Awards.

In 2022, Gong was cast in the SBS drama The First Responders alongside Kim Rae-won and Son Ho-jun. The second season is set to premiere in 2023.

Filmography

Film

Television series

Web series

Hosting

Television shows

Music video appearances

Discography

Singles

Ambassadorship

Awards and nominations

References

External links

 

1993 births
Living people
South Korean television actresses
South Korean television personalities
Sungshin Women's University alumni
People from Seoul
21st-century South Korean actresses
South Korean film actresses